The List of foreign players in Serbia may refer to:
 List of foreign basketball players in Serbia
 List of foreign football players in Serbia